Udea nebulatalis is a moth in the family Crambidae. It was described by Hiroshi Inoue, Hiroshi Yamanaka and Akio Sasaki in 2008. It is found on Hokkaido in Japan.

References

nebulatalis
Moths described in 2008